Jean Thomas may refer to:

Jean Bell Thomas (1942–1982), American folk festival promoter
Jean Thomas (biochemist) (born 1942), Chancellor of Swansea University
Jean Thomas (novelist), pseudonym of American romantic novelist Robert "Bob" Rogers

See also
Gene Thomas (disambiguation)